The 1964 Tour de Romandie was the 18th edition of the Tour de Romandie cycle race and was held from 7 May to 10 May 1964. The race started and finished in Geneva. The race was won by Rolf Maurer.

General classification

References

1964
Tour de Romandie
May 1964 sports events in Europe